Dudley Charles Trevelyan Tredger (born 15 November 1980 in Surrey, England) is an épée fencer, and Commonwealth Épée Champion, winning gold at Largs in 2014.

Career
Dudley fenced for England at the 2002 and 2010 Commonwealth Fencing Championships in Newcastle, Australia, winning gold and silver medals in the team event and two bronze medals as an individual.

In 2012, he won the épée title at the British Fencing Championships and his other fencing achievements include the final 8 at Luxembourg A Grade, 1st Bristol Open 2001, 1st Sussex Open 2001, 3rd Welsh Open 2002 and best young fencer on two occasions during his schooling at Hazelwick School.

Personal life
He works as an economics teacher at Whitgift School

References

Living people
1980 births
British male fencers
Schoolteachers from Surrey